Survivor South Africa: Panama is the first season of the South African reality television show Survivor South Africa, based on the international reality game show franchise Survivor. It was filmed in Panama, featuring 14 castaways competing for the grand prize of R1,000,000 prize. The season premiered on M-Net on 3 September 2006, with a live finale and reunion on November 26, 2006, where Vanessa Marawa was crowned South Africa's first Sole Survivor over Jacinda Louw by a vote of 3–2. The season was hosted by Mark Bayly, and co-produced by Endemol South Africa, and Strix (The production company that produced Expedition Robinson for Sweden).

The second season of the show, titled Survivor South Africa: Malaysia, was filmed and aired in 2007.

Contestants
The 14 castaways were divided into two predetermined tribes of seven, the blue Aguila (Spanish for Eagle) and the red Rana (Spanish for Frog). However, due to a medical evacuation on Day 12, a voted out castaway from Rana was spared eliminated and swapped over to Aguila. Day 17 saw the remaining 7 castaways merged into the yellow Burba tribe. The first four castaways voted out of Burba were unknowingly exiled to Deadman's Island, where they would compete for two of them to re-enter the game on Day 25.

Notes

Season summary
The game began with two tribes of seven: Aguila and Rana. Aguila proved to be the stronger tribe initially until Sam clashed with the tribe's provider, Mzi, and two fellow tribe members quit and were medically evacuated from the game respectively. Whereas the Rana tribe struggled to find their footing until Jacinda took control with Gareth and Lezel. A medical evacuation from the Aguila tribe on Day 12 saw Rana outsider, Danielle, survive being voted out by inheriting Sanele's torch; joining Aguila as a result. However, Aguila lost their physical strength over Rana when Sanele was evacuated, which forced them to vote out Danielle and, longtime Aguila outsider, Nico, before entering the merge in the minority.

On Day 17, the Final 7 players merged to form Burba. With Jacinda leading the votes, and Gareth winning Immunity challenges, the Rana 4 alliance successfully voted out the Aguila minority. When the only Rana 4 remained, Jacinda and Gareth betrayed close ally, Lezel, to keep a physically weaker Zayn for the Final 3 Immunity challenge. However, unbeknownst to the Final 3, throughout the merge the first 4 castaways voted out of Burba were exiled to Deadman's Island. They were exiled there until Day 25 where Mzi and Vanessa, two close Aguila allies, outlasted Brigitte and Lezel to re-enter the game. Upon their return, Jacinda decided to flip on Gareth with the help of the returnees. After voting out Gareth for being a physical threat, the new Final 4 competed in two challenges to determine the Final 2 of the Season. Vanessa won the first seat on Day 28, which saw Zayn lose and enter the jury. While Jacinda beat Mzi in a lengthy challenge on Day 29 to secure the second seat next to Vanessa that night at Final Tribal Council.

The Final Tribal Council saw Jacinda confronted with leading and then betraying the very same alliance she created, while Vanessa's reserved presence thorough the season was scrutinized in relation to her ally's, Mzi, active role as Aguila and Burba's food provider. In the end, the jury appreciated Vanessa's perseverance throughout the season over Jacinda's strategic leadership, making Vanessa the first South African Sole Survivor in a 3–2 final vote.

In the case of multiple tribes or castaways who win reward or immunity, they are listed in order of finish, or alphabetically where it was a team effort; where one castaway won and invited others, the invitees are in brackets.
Notes

Episodes

Voting history

External links

 TVSA's SA Survivor page
 Sole Survivor Blog
 Survivor: Malaysia - Sole Survivor Blog

Survivor South Africa seasons
Television shows filmed in Panama